"Don't Know Why" is a song written and composed by Jesse Harris that originally appeared on his 1999 album, Jesse Harris & the Ferdinandos. A cover of the song was the debut single of American singer Norah Jones from her debut studio album, Come Away with Me (2002).

Jones' version of "Don't Know Why" was released on January 28, 2002, peaked at number 30 on the US Billboard Hot 100 and was a critical success. The single went on to win three Grammy Awards in 2003 for Record of the Year, Song of the Year, and Best Female Pop Vocal Performance. It remains Jones's biggest hit single in the United States to date, and her only one to reach the top 40 of the Billboard Hot 100. "Don't Know Why" was also a modest hit abroad, reaching number five in Australia, number 24 in New Zealand, and number 59 in the United Kingdom. The song was ranked number 459 in Blender magazine's "500 Greatest Songs Since You Were Born".

Jones' piano-playing has been compared to that of Floyd Cramer, having a "style and grace, a musical maturity not found in many keyboard players today."

Music video
A music video directed by Anastasia Simone and Ian Spencer was released in 2002. It features Jones performing the song on a gray beach at sunrise, on a rocky hill, and at a beach rental stand accompanied by a wooden piano while undersea images are projected onto the walls.

Credits and personnel
Credits are lifted from the Come Away with Me album booklet.

Personnel
 Jesse Harris – writing, acoustic guitar, electric guitar
 Norah Jones – vocals, piano, production
 Lee Alexander – bass guitar
 Dan Rieser – drums
 Arif Mardin – production, mixing
 Jay Newland – production, engineering, mixing
 Mark Birkey – assistant engineering
 Ted Jensen – mastering

Technical credits
 Recorded at Sorcerer Sound (New York City) and Allaire Studios (Shokan, New York)
 Mixed at Sear Sound (New York City)
 Mastered at Sterling Sound (New York City)

Charts

Weekly charts

Year-end charts

Certifications

Release history

Parodies
 The children's television show Sesame Street parodied the song with Jones playing the song "I Don't Know Why Y Didn't Come" on the piano, about the letter Y not showing up. Elmo watches her play and briefly sings along, as the Y arrives late, during the song. 
 The sketch comedy show MADtv parodied the song in a commercial for the fictitious album Monotonous. The joke of the sketch is that the song sets the mood for wild parties despite its slow pace.

Covers
 Michelle Williams performed the song on the second US series of The Masked Singer.

References

External links
 "Don't Know Why" reviewed by Ted Gioia (Jazz.com)

1999 songs
2000s ballads
2002 debut singles
Blue Note Records singles
Grammy Award for Best Female Pop Vocal Performance
Grammy Award for Record of the Year
Grammy Award for Song of the Year
Norah Jones songs
Parlophone singles
Pop ballads
Song recordings produced by Arif Mardin
Songs written by Jesse Harris